Arsenicin A is a naturally occurring organoarsenic compound with molecular formula C3H6As4O3. It was first isolated from the New Caledonian marine sponge Echinochalina bargibanti.  The compound was characterized by computational and spectroscopic techniques and found to possess a cage-like structure similar to adamantane in which the four methanetriyl carbon bridgeheads are replaced by arsenic atoms and three of the six methylene bridges are replaced by oxygen atoms.  It is the first polyarsenic compound ever found in nature.  Subsequently, the proposed structure was prepared in large quantities via total synthesis and the structure was confirmed by x-ray crystallography. The molecule is chiral, and has been resolved into its two enantiomers. Arsenicin A is active against promelocytic leukemia cells at lower concentrations than the arsenic(III) oxide drug Trisenox.

References 

Organoarsenic compounds
Arsenic heterocycles
Oxygen heterocycles
Adamantane-like molecules